Martyniuk (Polish), Мартинюк (Ukrainian, transcribed as Martynyuk), or Мартынюк (Russian, transcribed as Martynyuk) is a patronimical surname of Ukrainian origin, it means son of Martyn.

Alexander Martynyuk, retired ice hockey player who played for the Soviet Hockey League
Dave Martyniuk, fictional character in Guy Gavriel Kay's fantasy trilogy "The Fionavar Tapestry"
Fedor Martyanovych Martyniuk, president of the Football Federation of the Ukrainian SSR
Leonid Martynyuk, Russian opposition journalist
Nikolai Martynyuk (1934–2021), Soviet and Russian naval officer
Teodor Martynyuk (born 1974), Ukrainian Greek Catholic hierarch.
Wacław Martyniuk, Polish politician
Yaroslav Martynyuk, Ukrainian football midfielder
Georgy Martyniuk (1913—1981), Soviet sound engineer.

See also
 
 

Ukrainian-language surnames
Surnames of Ukrainian origin